Highlanders FC is a Zimbabwean football club based in Bulawayo, Zimbabwe, formed in 1926 that plays in the Zimbabwe Premier Soccer League.  It is also known colloquially as iBosso.

Founded in 1926 as Lions Football Club, composed mainly of boys born in Makokoba (Bulawayo's oldest township) by two of the Ndebele King Lobengula’s grandsons, Albert and Rhodes, who were sons of Njube. In 1936, the players changed the name to Matebeleland Highlanders Football Club.

Nicknames
Highlanders are known by their nicknames, Bosso, Tshilamoya, Amahlolanyama, Ezikamagebhula, High High, Mantengwane among many others. Bosso is derived from Setswana slang and means "The Boss. "Tshilamoya is IsiNdebele and, loosely interpreted, could mean "big-upsetters" or "demoralisers", a term coined in apparent reference to the Team's nemesis. Amahlolanyama is taken from the Grey-Crested Helmet-shrike, a bird found mostly in Southern parts of Zimbabwe whose black and white colours resemble those of the team's. EzikaMagebhula, a nickname for Orlando Pirates, can also be used in reference to Highlanders FC, possibly because of the similarity of both clubs' colours. Ezimnyama ngenkani means the blacks by force.

Club motto

"Siyinqaba!" – "We are a Fortress!"

History

19th century-  Colonialists decided to placate the Ndebele King Lobengula with a proposal to send his grandsons to study in the Cape Province in South Africa. The names of the two grandsons were Albert and Rhodes, sons of Njube.

1926 – The two brothers returned from South Africa, where Albert had completed studies in agriculture at Tsolo Agricultural School and Rhodes completed studies in bookkeeping at Lovedale Institute. Both had taken to football as extramural activities. Rhodes continued playing soccer and formed a team called the Lions Football Club, composed mainly of boys born in Makokoba (Bulawayo's oldest township).

1936 – the players changed the name to Matebeleland Highlanders Football Club.

1966 – the Rhodesia National Football League (RNFL) asked Highlanders to join them. They agreed and two years later were drafted into the 2nd Division. Highlanders finished top on their first year and were promoted to Division One.

1970 – the team was in the Super League, but after collecting just 7 points, they were relegated back to the first division but were back in the top flight again a year later in 1971.

1972 – Tony McIlveen, a British export from Northern Ireland, joined the side. McIlveen had previous experience playing semi-professionally for Irish League side Crusaders, and whilst not known for his height, his tenacity as a midfield dynamo was an added bonus to the vastly improving side.

1973 – Highlanders FC won the Chibuku Trophy, beating high-profile Mangula at Rufaro Stadium. Players who clinched the honours included Ananias Dube, Billy Sibanda, Kenny Ngulube, Edward Dzowa, Andrew Jele, Tommy Masuku, Lawrence Phiri, Josiah Nxumalo, Geoffrey Mpofu, Boet Van As, Tymon Mabaleka, Gavin Dubely, Bruce Grobbelaar, Barry Daka, Tony McIlveen, and others.

1976 – Highlanders became dissatisfied with the national administration led by Mr. John Madzima, and pulled out of the RNFL to help form the South Zone Soccer League (SZSL). Some disgruntled senior members of the team broke away from Highlanders to form their own club, Olympics, even taking the black & white strip. But Highlanders survived. The teams that formed the nucleus of the SZSL were Black Chiefs, Callies, Portuguese, Old Miltonians, and Highlanders (all from Bulawayo), Black Horrors (Plumtree), Ramblers (Gwanda), and Go Beer Rovers (Gwelo).

1979 – most Harare-based clubs saw the wisdom of Highlanders' decision and lent their support to the club against the national association's injustices, i.e. unfair gate takings distribution, improper methods of accounting of finances, and preferential treatment of certain teams. The National Professional Soccer League (NPSL) was then formed as a result.

1980 – NPSL and the RNFL were merged to form the Zimbabwe Football Association (ZIFA).

1986 – a group of senior players left after falling out with the executives over money. Apprentices were upgraded to the senior team. Players who included the likes of Rahman Gumbo, Mercedes Sibanda, Willard "Nduuuna"  Mashinkila-Khumalo, Madinda Ndlovu, Dumisani Ngulube and many others.

Between 1999 and 2002 Highlanders won the Premier League four seasons back to back. In 1999 and 2000 they were coached by Rahman Gumbo. Gumbo was sacked for failure to reach the African champions league’s money spinning mini league. In 2001 a Briton Eddie May was handed over the job to Coach Bosso as they are affectionately known by their fans and he went on to win two Premier league titles back to back. During the period 1999 and 2002 Highlanders had a talented squad consisting of Darlington Phiri, Blessing Gumiso, Anzlom “Malume” Ndlovu, Eddie “Tastic Rice” Nyika, Melody “Tshabalala” Wafawanaka, Thabani “Mqwayi” Masawi, Eddie “Amokachi” Dube, Noel “Beckham” Kaseke, Dazy “Walker the Texas Ranger” Kapenya, Bekithemba “Super SaMaNdlo” Ndlovu, Britto Gwere, Honour Gombami, Richard “Dabuka Express” Choruma, Johannes ”Signature” Ngodzo, Sautso “Special meat” Phiri, Charles Chilufya, Gift Lunga Junior, Tapuwa “Campos” Kapini, Melusi Mabaleka Sibanda, Siza Khoza, Zenzo “the Terminator” Moyo, Joel “Dubai” Luphahla, Thulani “Biya” Ncube, Mubariki “the Black Mamba” Chisoni, Edmore “Mamkwebu” SIBANDA, Pope Moyo, Mkhokheli Dube, Tapela “Cyclone” Ngwenya, Adam “Adamski” Ndlovu, Stuart “Shutto” Murisa. At that time Bosso had a great leadership in Retired Colonel James Mangwana Tshuma, Enerst SIBANDA, Kenny Ndebele, Liqhwa Gama, Nhanhla Dube and well respected medic Dr Emmett Ndlovu. 

In 2006 they were led by a former star midfielder with Methembe Ndlovu, when they were last crowned champions. The team consisted of Vusa Nyoni, Johannes Ngodzo, Honour Gombami, Ralph “Banolila” Matema, Obadiah Tarumbwa to mention just a few.

In Zimbabwe, players from Highlanders who have played at the highest level of professional football in the world include players like Peter Ndlovu, Bruce Grobelaar, and Benjamin Nkonjera.

Highlanders is the second-most supported club in Zimbabwe with over 5 million supporters, after Dynamos who have over 7 million supporters. The support for these two clubs has tribal origins, as Highlanders are supported by both Ndebele-speaking people and those residing in the Matebeleland region.

Rivalry

Highlanders most bitter rival is Dynamos from Harare and the matches between these two giants have been dubbed "Battle of Zimbabwe". The battles between Bosso and Dembare are similar to those ones between the two Soweto Giants Orlando Pirates and Kaizer Chiefs in South Africa in the Soweto derby. CAPS United is also another Bosso's rival and the matches pitting these two teams have been dubbed "Battle of the Cities". These matches were in the past associated with a lot of violent clashes amongst the fans.

Honours

Zimbabwe Premier Soccer League: 7
1990, 1993, 1999, 2000, 2001, 2002, 2006

Zimbabwean Cup: 2,Mbada Diamonds Cup: 1,NetOne Challenge Cup 1
1990, 2001,2013,2015Zimbabwean Independence Trophy: 91986, 1988, 1991, 1998, 2001, 2002, 2011,2019,2022Zimbabwean Charity Shield: 51986 (Rothmans Shield),
 2001, 2005(Dairy Board Charity Shield),
 2015,2016 (ZNA Charity Shield) Chibuku Cup:6 1973, 1980,1984,1986,1989,2019Natbrew Cup:11986Heroes Cup:11986Cosmos Challenge Cup:21998,1999BP Cup:11994Livingstone Memorial Cup:21953,1955

Performance in CAF competitionsCAF Champions League: 5 appearances2000 – Second Round
2001 – First Round
2002 – First Round
2003 – Second Round
2007 – First Round

 African Cup of Champions Clubs: 2 appearances1991 – Second Round
1994 – disqualified in First RoundCAF Confederation Cup: 2 appearances2008 – Round of 16
2011 – withdrew in Preliminary RoundCAF Cup Winners' Cup: 3 appearances'1986 – First Round
1987 – First Round
1992 – First Round

StaffChairman Johnfat SibandaVice Chairman Sfiso SizibaClub Secretary Morgen DubeTreasurer Busani MthombeniCommittee Member Mgcini MafuHead Coach Baltemar BritoAssistant Coach Antonio TorresSecond Assistant Coach Joel LuphahlaGoalkeeper's Coach Daniel KhumaloTeam Manager Vezigama DlodloTeam Doctor Hillary TshumaTeam Physiotherapist''
 Loyal Nyika

Notable former coaches
 Rahman Gumbo
 Barry Daka
 Cosmas Zulu
 Eddie May (2001–03)
 Methembe Ndlovu (2006–07)
 Madinda Ndlovu (2009)
 Dick Chama
 Kelvin Kaindu
 Bongani Mafu (2015–2016)
 Mark Harrison (2020-2021)
 Mandla Mpofu (2021-2022)
 Baltemar Brito (2022-2023)

Notable former players
 Peter Ndlovu
 Adam Ndlovu
 Bruce Grobbelaar
 Benjani Mwaruwari
 Marvelous Nakamba
 Andrew Shue
 Ethan Zohn

References

External links
 Facebook
 Twitter
 Official fan site
 Highlanders FC page on FootballZone – Zimbabwe football website

 
Football clubs in Zimbabwe
Association football clubs established in 1926
1926 establishments in Southern Rhodesia